Morton Feldman (January 12, 1926 – September 3, 1987) was an American composer. A major figure in 20th-century classical music, Feldman was a pioneer of indeterminate music, a development associated with the experimental New York School of composers also including John Cage, Christian Wolff, and Earle Brown. Feldman's works are characterized by notational innovations that he developed to create his characteristic sound: rhythms that seem to be free and floating, pitch shadings that seem softly unfocused, a generally quiet and slowly evolving music, and recurring asymmetric patterns. His later works, after 1977, also explore extremes of duration.

Biography
Feldman was born in Woodside, Queens, into a family of Russian-Jewish immigrants. His parents, Irving Feldman (1893–1985) and Frances Breskin Feldman (1897–1984), emigrated to New York from Pereiaslav (father, 1910) and Bobruysk (mother, 1901). His father was a manufacturer of children's coats. As a child he studied piano with Vera Maurina Press, who, according to the composer himself, instilled in him a "vibrant musicality rather than musicianship". Feldman's first composition teachers were Wallingford Riegger, one of the first American followers of Arnold Schoenberg, and Stefan Wolpe, a German-born Jewish composer who studied under Franz Schreker and Anton Webern. Feldman and Wolpe spent most of their time simply talking about music and art.

In early 1950 Feldman heard the New York Philharmonic perform Anton Webern's Symphony, op. 21. After this work, the orchestra was going to perform a piece by Sergei Rachmaninoff, and Feldman left immediately, disturbed by the audience's disrespectful reaction to Webern's work. In the lobby he met John Cage, who was at the concert and had also decided to step out. The two quickly became friends, with Feldman moving into the apartment on the second floor of the building Cage lived in. Through Cage, he met sculptor Richard Lippold (who had a studio next door with artist Ray Johnson); artists Sonia Sekula, Robert Rauschenberg, and others; and composers such as Henry Cowell, Virgil Thomson, and George Antheil.

With Cage's encouragement, Feldman began to write pieces that had no relation to compositional systems of the past, such as traditional harmony or the serial technique. He experimented with nonstandard systems of musical notation, often using grids in his scores, and specifying how many notes should be played at a certain time but not which ones. Feldman's experiments with chance in turn inspired Cage to write pieces like Music of Changes, where the notes to be played are determined by consulting the I Ching.

Through Cage, Feldman met many other prominent figures in the New York arts scene, among them Jackson Pollock, Philip Guston and Frank O'Hara. He found inspiration in the paintings of the abstract expressionists, and in the 1970s wrote a number of pieces around 20 minutes in length, including Rothko Chapel (1971, written for the building of the same name, which houses paintings by Mark Rothko) and For Frank O'Hara (1973). In 1977, he wrote the opera Neither with original text by Samuel Beckett.

Feldman was commissioned to compose the score for Jack Garfein's 1961 film Something Wild, but after hearing the music for the opening scene, in which a character (played by Carroll Baker, incidentally also Garfein's wife) is raped, the director promptly withdrew his commission, opting to enlist Aaron Copland instead. The director's reaction was said to be, "My wife is being raped and you write celesta music?"

Feldman's music "changed radically" in 1970, moving away from graphic and arhythmic notation systems and toward rhythmic precision. The first piece of this new period was a short, 55-measure work, "Madame Press Died Last Week at Ninety", dedicated to his childhood piano teacher, Vera Maurina Press.

In 1973, at the age of 47, Feldman became the Edgard Varèse Professor (a title of his own devising) at the University at Buffalo. Until then, Feldman had earned his living as a full-time employee at the family textile business in New York's garment district. In addition to teaching at SUNY Buffalo, Feldman held residencies during the mid-1980s at the University of California, San Diego.

Later, he began to produce very long works, often in one continuous movement, rarely shorter than half an hour in length and often much longer. These include Violin and String Quartet (1985, around 2 hours), For Philip Guston (1984, around four hours) and, most extreme, the String Quartet II (1983, over six hours long without a break). These pieces typically maintain a very slow developmental pace and are mostly very quiet. Feldman said that quiet sounds had begun to be the only ones that interested him. In a 1982 lecture, he asked: "Do we have anything in music for example that really wipes everything out? That just cleans everything away?"

Feldman married the Canadian composer Barbara Monk shortly before his death. He died of pancreatic cancer in 1987 at his home in Buffalo, New York.

Works
See: List of compositions by Morton Feldman

Notable students

Footnotes

Sources

Further reading
 Cline, David. The Graph Music of Morton Feldman. Cambridge University Press, 2016
 Eldred, Michael The Quivering of Propriation: A Parallel Way to Music, Section II.4.4 A musical subversion of harmonically logical time (Feldman) www.arte-fact.org 2010
 Feldman, Morton. Morton Feldman Says. Chris Villars, ed. London: Hyphen Press, 2006.
 Feldman, Morton. Morton Feldman in Middelburg. Lectures and Conversations. Raoul Mörchen, ed. Cologne: , 2008.
 Feldman, Morton. Give my regards to Eighth Street: Collected Writings of Morton Feldman. B. H. Friedman, ed. Cambridge, Massachusetts: Exact Change, 2000.
 Gareau, Philip. La musique de Morton Feldman ou le temps en liberté. Paris: L'Harmattan, 2006.
 Hirata, Catherin (Winter 1996). "The Sounds of the Sounds Themselves: Analyzing the Early Music of Morton Feldman", Perspectives of New Music 34, no. 1, 6–27.
 Herzfeld, Gregor. "Historisches Bewusstsein in Morton Feldmans Unterrichtsskizzen", Archiv für Musikwissenschaft, vol. 66, no. 3, (Summer 2009), 218–233.
 Lunberry, Clark. "Departing Landscapes: Morton Feldman's String Quartet II and Triadic Memories". SubStance 110: vol. 35, no. 2 (Summer 2006): 17–50. (Available at http://www.cnvill.net/mftexts.htm [#105 on the list])
 Noble, Alistair. Composing Ambiguity: The Early Music of Morton Feldman. Farnham: Ashgate, 2013.

External links

Morton Feldman Page
Morton Feldman Photographs, 1939–1987 from University at Buffalo Libraries
Jan Williams Photos of Morton Feldman, 1974–1979 from University at Buffalo Libraries
Morton Feldman in conversation with Thomas Moore
Morton Feldman: Structures for String Quartet (1951) by Lejaren Hiller
GregSandow.com: Feldman Draws Blood, The Village Voice, June 16, 1980
Morton Feldman profile at New Albion Records
Morton Feldman at Pytheas Center for Contemporary Music
Interview with pianist Philip Thomas, about his recording of Feldman's complete piano music, on The Next Track podcast

Listening 
Art of the States: Morton Feldman, three works by Feldman
UbuWeb: Morton Feldman, featuring The King of Denmark
Epitonic.com: Morton Feldman, featuring tracks from Only – Works for Voice and Instruments
In Conversation with John Cage, 1966, Part 1, part 2, part 3, part 4, part 5 

American male classical composers
American classical composers
Deaths from pancreatic cancer
Experimental composers
Fiorello H. LaGuardia High School alumni
Jewish American classical composers
Jewish classical musicians
Jewish American artists
Pupils of Wallingford Riegger
Pupils of Stefan Wolpe
20th-century classical composers
University at Buffalo alumni
1926 births
1987 deaths
University at Buffalo faculty
Deaths from cancer in New York (state)
American people of Russian-Jewish descent
20th-century American composers
20th-century American male musicians
People from Woodside, Queens
20th-century American Jews